Trechnotheria is a group of mammals that includes the therians and some fossil mammals from the Mesozoic Era. In the Jurassic through Cretaceous periods, the group was endemic to what would be Asia and Africa.

Trechnotheria has been assigned various ranks, but was originally described as a "superlegion" by the naming authority.
A later node-based definition for Trechnotheria was the clade comprising the last common ancestor of Zhangheotherium and living therian mammals, and all its descendants.

Characteristics 
Like most Mesozoic mammal groups, early trechnotherians are known mainly from their teeth.  Hence, one of the most prominent features of this group is the "hypertrophied postvallum/prevallid shearing mechanism", along with other dental characters.  Features of the shoulder blade, tibia, humerus, and ankle joint also diagnose this clade.

Phylogeny
A cladogram based on Luo, Cifelli & Kielan-Jaworowska, 2001, Luo, Kielan-Jaworowska & Cifelli, 2002 and, Kielan-Jaworowska, Cifelli & Luo, 2004.

 Unassigned Trechnotheria:
†Austrotriconodon mckennai Bonaparte 1986 {Austrotriconodontidae Bonaparte 1990}
†Chaoyangodens lii Hou & Meng 2014
Paraphyletic Symmetrodonta Simpson 1925
†Atlasodon monbaroni Sigogneau-Russell 1991 [Dryolestida, or Zatheria indet., milk tooth (Averianov, 2002)]
†Kennetheredium leesi Sigogneau-Russell 2003a
†Kotatherium haldanei Datta 1981
†Trishulotherium kotaensis Yadagiri 1985
 Unassigned Cladotheria:
†Afriquiamus nesovi Sigogneau-Russell 1999
†Butlerigale Kühne 1968
†Chunnelodon alopekodes Ensom & Sigogneau-Russell 1998
†Guimarota freyi Kuhne 1968
 Unassigned Zatheria:
†Arguimus khoshajari Dashzeveg 1979 [Arguitherium cromptoni Dashzeveg 1994] {Arguimuridae Dashzeveg 1994 [Arguitheriidae Dashzeveg 1994]}
†Minimus richardfoxi Sigogneau-Russell 1999
†Magnimus ensomi Sigogneau-Russell 1999
†Mozomus shikamai Li et al. 2005 {Mozomuridae Li et al. 2005}
†Nanolestes Martin 2002
†N. drescherae Martin 2002
†N. krusati Martin 2002
†N. mackennai Martin, Averianov & Pfretzschner 2010
 Unassigned Boreosphenida:
†Argaliatherium robustum Cifelli & Davis 2015
†Carinalestes murensis Cifelli & Davis 2015
†Hypomylos Sigogneau-Russell 1992
†H. phelizoni Sigogneau-Russell 1992
†H. micros Sigogneau-Russell 1994
†Picopsidae Fox 1980
†Picopsis pattersoni Fox 1980
†Tirotherium aptum Montellano-Ballesteros & Fox 2015

Sources

See also
Allotheria
Cladotheria

 
Norian first appearances
Extant Late Triassic first appearances
Taxa described in 1975